Ruth Elizabeth Hunt, Baroness Hunt of Bethnal Green (born 12 March 1980) is a Welsh administrator who was Chief Executive of UK-based lesbian, gay, bisexual and trans equality charity Stonewall, the largest LGBT equality body in Europe, from 2014 until her resignation in 2019.

Hunt was nominated for a life peerage and Crossbench member of the House of Lords in the 2019 Prime Minister's Resignation Honours. She was created Baroness Hunt of Bethnal Green, of Bethnal Green in the London Borough of Tower Hamlets, on 16 October 2019.

She was formerly President of the Oxford University Student Union.

Biography
Hunt was educated at Christ the King Primary School, Cardiff, New College, Cardiff, a former independent school, and King Edward VI Camp Hill School for Girls, Birmingham, before going on to study English Language and Literature at St Hilda's College, Oxford.

Hunt joined the Equality Challenge Unit, an organisation which promoted "equality for staff employed in the higher education sector", in January 2004 where she led work to advise Higher Education Institutions on sexual orientation and gender identity equality.

In 2005, she joined Stonewall in the role of Senior Policy Officer where she led work on Stonewall's research into homophobic bullying in schools. She became Head of Policy and Research in 2007 and Director of Public Affairs in 2009.

During this time Hunt produced research into lesbian, gay and bisexual health needs and inequalities, religion and belief and its impact on sexual orientation equality, older gay people's experiences in Britain and, in 2012, the first guide looking at openly gay role models.

In 2013, Hunt was named as Deputy Chief Executive of Stonewall, overseeing the strategic development and delivery of Stonewall's policy, research, campaigns and information functions which includes the work of Stonewall's Public Affairs team, Education team, the Stonewall Information Service and Stonewall Scotland and Stonewall Cymru.

In July 2014, after a period as Acting Chief Executive, she was named Chief Executive of Stonewall.

Hunt has overseen the growth of Stonewall's work in Scotland and Wales, in particular the establishment of the Stonewall Cymru bilingual information service and Stonewall Scotland's lobbying to secure the Marriage and Civil Partnership (Scotland) Bill. She gave evidence to the Scottish Parliament Equal Opportunities Committee on marriage equality in September 2013.

Hunt leads Stonewall's work on policy development and strategic influencing, in particular developing strategic partnerships with organisations across the public and private sector. She has led work with organisations such as the Ministry of Defence, the UK Border Agency, the Home Office and Accenture.

As Deputy Chief Executive, Hunt was involved in Stonewall's campaign regarding the Marriage (Same Sex Couples) Bill in England and Wales.

She was involved in Stonewall's campaign regarding the Human Fertilisation and Embryology Act 2008, legalising lesbian to access fertility treatment.

In October 2013, in its "Pink List", the Independent on Sunday named Hunt as the fifth most influential LGBT person in Britain. In 2014, she dropped to eighth place in the renamed "Rainbow List", and in 2015 she was voted into third place. In 2015, she also received an honorary fellowship from Cardiff University, where her mother Sheila was then Professor of Nursing, and an honorary degree from Keele University.

She attracted much attention in May 2014 when she announced in The Daily Telegraph that Stonewall would not be joining a wide boycott of The Dorchester hotel in London, owned by the Sultan of Brunei, Hassanal Bolkiah, where Stonewall was to hold a gala dinner. Bolkiah was proposing to introduce the death penalty for sodomy but she argued that there was not "a mandate for the boycott" and "We only implement actions that we can calculate will have an impact."

Hunt edited The Book of Queer Prophets, a collection of essays on sexuality and religion to be published in May 2020. The book includes essays by Jeanette Winterson, Phyll Opoku-Gyimah, John L. Bell, and others.

She publicly apologised days before the 2015 general election after Stonewall was criticised for publishing an online campaign graphic which suggested that only the Labour Party substantially supported LGBT equality in its manifesto.

In 2019, some donors were reported by The Sunday Times to have stopped funding Stonewall as a consequence of Hunt's position on trans equality. One donor was reported as saying that Hunt was "no longer a worthy champion of our rights", another that she had "lost what the big principle is".

Personal life 
Hunt entered a civil partnership with her partner Kirsty Lloyd in 2010, although it was reported in 2014 that the couple had separated.

Hunt works with her current partner, Caroline Ellis, as codirectors of Deeds and Words. Hunt and Ellis live together in London in a civil partnership.

Hunt is a practising Roman Catholic and has spoken out in favour of bridging the gap between faith leaders and LGBT communities.

References

External links

 Ruth Hunt's page on Stonewall's official website

Welsh LGBT rights activists
Living people
Welsh lesbians
LGBT Roman Catholics
1980 births
British Roman Catholics
People educated at King Edward VI Camp Hill School for Girls
Alumni of St Hilda's College, Oxford
Crossbench life peers
Welsh LGBT politicians
LGBT life peers
Life peers created by Elizabeth II